The Common Denominator is a quiz show that aired on Channel 4 from 18 February 2013 to 19 April 2013. The programme was hosted by Phil Spencer.

Format
Contestants were given two phrases, and must state the single word that links the phrases together. For example, the two phrases could be "Wikipedia" and "The United Kingdom", with the link in this case being "Wales"; Jimbo Wales founded Wikipedia, and Wales is a country in the United Kingdom.

References

External links
 
 

2013 British television series debuts
2013 British television series endings
2010s British game shows
Channel 4 game shows
English-language television shows
Television series by Banijay